A Christmas Kind of Town is a Christmas album released by the band Marah in 2005.

Reception 
Tim Sendra of Allmusic called A Christmas Kind of Town an "utterly heartwarming and joyous album". Jim Musser of the Iowa City Press-Citizen called the album "upbeat, inclusive and downright irresistible". Jay Lustig of The Star-Ledger wrote that the song "New York Is a Christmas Kind of Town" is "a thoroughly modern Christmas song, but one with a classic feel".

Track listing

Personnel
 David Bielanko – singing, guitar, bass, banjo, percussion, car horns, xylophone, jingle bells, etc.
 Serge Bielanko – singing, guitar, banjo, harmonica, singing into the dryer, percussion, jingle bells, etc.
 Kirk Henderson – piano, organ, mellotron, music box, bass, guitar solo for the ages, xylophone, percussion, trumpets, backing vocals, jingle bells
 Adam Garbinski – guitar, Christmas enthusiasm, backing vocals
 Dave "Fire & Ice" Petersen – drums, backing vocals, Christmas enthusiasm
 Christine Smith – piano, vocals on "It's Cold Outside", drums on "New York Is A Christmas Kind Of Town"
 Ahneeta Shalita – vocals on "Christmas With The Snow" and "Here We Come A-Wassailing", backing vocals, "Bing Bings"
 Kazual Shalita – vocals on "Christmas With The Snow" and "Here We Come A-Wassailing", backing vocals, "Bing Bings"
 Lowlita Shalita vocals on "Christmas With The Snow" and "Here We Come A-Wassailing", backing vocals, "Bing Bings"
 Monica Bielanko – Vocals on "Handsome Santa"
 Gregory "Christmastime" Wilson – Christmas Spirit, snapping, clapping, backing vocals, fried chicken
 Larry Anderson – generosity, backing vocals

The album was dedicate to "anyone and everyone, regardless of religion or race, who just likes it when December rolls in."

References 

Marah (band) albums
2005 Christmas albums
Christmas albums by American artists